Michael McManus (born January 26, 1946 in Minneapolis, Minnesota) is an American actor. His best known movie role is perhaps Ben Tuthill in the 1982 film Poltergeist. He has also appeared  in the films Mother, Jugs & Speed (1976), Police Academy 4: Citizens on Patrol (1987), Funland (1987) and Action Jackson (1988).

McManus was a series regular on the television sitcom Lewis & Clark as John, the bartender; the series lasted only one season of thirteen episodes. McManus also guest starred in several popular television series including M*A*S*H, Laverne & Shirley, Rhoda,  The Six Million Dollar Man, Dallas, Happy Days, Night Court, Knight Rider, Mr. Belvedere, Growing Pains, Newhart, Full House, Webster, The Golden Girls, Hunter and Columbo among others. In 1989, he had a recurring role as  Sid Wilson on the first season of Baywatch. McManus' last known screen acting appearance was in a 2001 episode of According to Jim.

Filmography

References

External links

20th-century American male actors
21st-century American male actors
Male actors from Minneapolis
American male film actors
American male television actors
Living people
1946 births